Ratip Kazancıgil (1920 – 12 August 2017) was a Turkish medical doctor, history researcher and academician.

In addition to his work in public health in Edirne, he also served as the Mayor of Edirne in 1955. Süheyl Ünver became known as "Edirne Lover" after Rifat Osman and Hafız Rakım Ertür.

Life 
He was born in Malatya in 1920. He completed his primary, secondary and high school education in Malatya. He entered Istanbul University Faculty of Medicine in 1937 and graduated in 1943.

Awards 
Turkish Medical Association Nusret Fişek Public Health Award, 1991.

Works 

 Edirne Mahalleleri Tarihçesi (1529-1990), Türk Kütüphaneciler Derneği Edirne Şubesi, Yayınları; 1990. 
 Edirne İmaretleri, Kütüphaneciler Derneği Edirne Şubesi Yayınları; 1991.
 Edirne Helva Sohbetleri ve Kış Eğlenceleri, Türk Kütüphaneciler Derneği Edirne Şubesi Yayınları; 1993.
 Edirne'de Sultan II. Bayezıd Külliyesi, Türk Kütüphaneciler Derneği Edirne Şubesi Yayınları, 1994.
 Edirne Şehir Tarihi Kronolojisi (M:1330-H:1994), Türk Kütüphaneciler Derneği Edirne Şubesi Yayınları; 1995. 
 Edirne Sağlık ve Sosyal Yardım Tarihi
 Edirne'de Osmanlı döneminden 2000 yılına kalan Mîmari Eserler,Edirne Valiliği Yayınları; 2000.

Source:

References 

1920 births
2017 deaths
Istanbul University Faculty of Medicine alumni
Academic staff of Trakya University
20th-century Turkish physicians
Turkish public health doctors